Richard Westbrook (born 10 July 1975) is a British professional racing driver noted for his success in racing Porsche and International sports cars. As a junior, he attended St Joseph's College, Ipswich. He has won both the Porsche Supercup international championship (in 2006 & 2007) and the Porsche Carrera Cup in his native Britain (2004). At the end of the 2007 season, Richard signed a factory contract deal with the German marque Porsche, and the British ace proceeded to take on the world's best on the other side of the Atlantic. The next year (2009), Westbrook won the highly coveted FIA GT2 Championship, taking four victories in the process, establishing himself firmly on the World motor sport stage and in the upper echelons of elite sports car drivers.

In 2011 Westbrook signed with Corvette as a factory driver, competing in both the Rolex Sports Car Series and American Le Mans Series. Notably, in 2013 Richard won the 12 Hours of Sebring. For the 2016 United SportsCar Championship, he will join the Chip Ganassi Racing to drive the new Ford GT.

Outside of racing, Westbrook is a keen cook (he studied at Kingsway College, Vincent Square in London, UK) and has taken part in three London Marathons. He is married to Jessica and has a daughter.

Early career

Early Years (1986–1996)
Born in Chelmsford, Westbrook began karting in 1986.

Following a successful Formula Vauxhall Winter Series campaign in 1993 (2nd place in the series, 1 win), he headed to Europe to compete in the Formula Opel Lotus Euroseries. After a promising showing (4th place in the series, 1 win) in his debut year, he returned in 1995 and took three victories, narrowly missing out on third place in the series.

In 1996 Westbrook moved up to Formula 3 and headed for the highly competitive German Formula 3 Series (with Tokmakidis Motorsport) and the Austrian Formula 3 Cup (Achletiner Motorsport). In German F3, he was up against a number of European drivers, including future F1 stars like Nick Heidfeld and Jarno Trulli and he took one win in a short campaign.

In Austria, having missed the opening pair of races due to cutting a late deal, Westbrook saw off the challenge of German racer Tim Bergmeister and a host of local drivers to take two victories in 1996 before missing the final two rounds due to budgetary issues.

Career Break (1997–2002)
Having been unable to secure the budget required to compete and advance his career, Westbrook was forced to take a lengthy six-year break from racing, before convincing a friend to loan him the money to buy a Porsche GT3 Cup Car for the 2002 season.

Porsche (2003–2010) 
The Porsche Carrera Cup GB commenced in 2003 and Westbrook was immediately a front-runner. Between 2003 and 2005, he was dominant; taking the title in 2004 (7 wins, 17 podiums, 8 pole positions, 4 fastest laps) with Redline Racing and finishing as runner-up in 2003 (Team BCR), and 2005 (Redline Racing). Indeed, his 2005 totals for victories and pole positions (14 wins, 8 pole-positions) are both series records and he went on to take 16 podiums across the season.

Having done a few Supercup races in 2002 with Kadach Racing Team and in 2003 with Porsche Cars Great Britain, he returned in 2005 in a Lechner Racing School Team prepared Porsche in rounds which did not clash with his UK commitments. He won the season opener in Bahrain and came 9th overall, adding a fastest lap to his tally too.

In 2006 with RT Morellato PZ Essen (4 wins, 11 podiums, 4 pole positions, 3 fastest laps), he finished every Supercup race on the podium, wrapping up the title with two races to go, against drivers such as Uwe Alzen, Alessandro Zampedri and Patrick Huisman. He has also competed in several Carrera races in Germany (EMC Buchbinder ARAXA Racing – 1 win, 4 podiums, 2 fastest laps) and also back in the UK (Red Line Racing – 4 races, 3 wins, 2 fastest laps) where he alternated with Danny Watts.

In 2007 with HISAQ Competition, he won his second Porsche Supercup title in a row, with wins in Spain and Hungary, along with five other podium finishes and fastest laps. He again competed in Carrera Cup Deutschland, finishing second in the championship for ARAXA Racing (5 wins, 1 pole position, 4 fastest laps). In the same year, he made his debut in the Le Mans Series in a GT2 Porsche for James Watt Automotive and in the Rolex Sports Car Series at Daytona and Watkins Glen with Synergy Racing in a Porsche GT3 Cup Car.

2008 – see next chapter 'Porsche Factory Driver'.

In 2009 Westbrook drove for VICI Racing (T-Mobile VICI Racing) in the American Le Mans Series (including the Sebring 12h) and for Prospeed Competition in the FIA GT Championship. In his first ALMS race of the year he finished fourth at Long Beach, alongside Johannes Stuck. However, it was in the FIA GT Championship where he would achieve his biggest success, winning the GT2 class overall after victories at Silverstone (UK), Adria (Italy), Hungaroring (Hungary) and Zolder (Belgium) backed up by second places in Algarve (Portugal) and Paul Ricard (France), in a Porsche 911 GT3 RSR (997). In the same year he also made appearances in International GT Open, ADAC GT Masters, Rolex Sports Car Series (including the Daytona 24h – 15th), Porsche Carrera Cup Deutschland, Porsche Supercup, and Belgian GT.

In 2010 he made his debut in the 24 Hours of Le Mans in the GT2 class, driving a Porsche 997 GT3-RSR for BMS Scuderia Italia alongside Marco Holzer and Timo Scheider; the trio finished 14th overall and third in class (GT2). He also competed in three further 'twice round the clock' events, the 24 Hours of Spa (Prospeed Competition), the 24 Hours of Nurburgring (Haribo Team Manthey), and the 24 Hours of Daytona where he finished third overall in the Crown Royal/NPN Racing BMW Riley alongside Ryan Hunter Reay, Lucas Luhr, and Scott Tucker.

There were also outings for Westbrook in the Le Mans Series for Prospeed Competition, but it was his stand-out star performances in a Matech Ford GT1 during the final six rounds of the 2010 FIA GT1 World Championship that would turn heads, taking three podiums alongside Thomas Mutsch.

He also took part in the British GT Championship in 2010 (3 podiums, 1 pole position, 1 fastest lap), helping Trackspeed team owner/racer David Ashburn to the title that year.

Porsche Factory Driver (2008–2009)

After multiple successes in Porsches, Westbrook signed with the German marque to become the first British Porsche factory driver since Derek Bell in the 1980s. He competed in a global programme that included the FIA GT Championship (Prospeed Competition), Le Mans Series (Farnbacher Racing) and American Le Mans Series (Farnbacher Loles Motorsport). He was the only driver to win at least one race in all three categories. He also competed in three 24-hour races; Spa 24h (Prospeed Competition – GT2 – 6th), Daytona 24h (TRG – GT – 2nd) and the Dubai 24 Hours (Proton Competition – A6)

Corvette Factory Driver (2011–2015) 
Following nine successful years racing predominantly in Porsches, in 2011 Westbrook joined Corvette Racing as the third driver in the No. 4 Compuware Corvette C6.R. Westbrook and his co-drivers Jan Magnussen and fellow Brit Oliver Gavin posted fourth-place finishes in 2011 in Sebring and Road Atlanta, and they were leading at Le Mans at the 16-hour mark when the car was involved in an accident and subsequently retired.

He had a second year in that role for 2012, teamed with young American driver Tommy Milner and again with Oliver Gavin in the major American Le Mans Series endurance events: Sebring 12-hour, Le Mans 24 Hours, and 1000-mile Petit Le Mans. Also in 2012, he received a new challenge, a full-season in the Rolex Sports Car Series in Spirit of Daytona Racing's all new Corvette Coyote DP alongside Spaniard, Antonio García. The pair took three wins and one further podium, with Westbrook securing three pole-positions too.

The 2013 season saw Westbrook take part in the final year of the Rolex Sports Car Series again with the Spirit of Daytona Racing team in the Corvette Coyote DP. He drove alongside Ricky Taylor and the pair were regulars in the top-five, taking a podium (third place) at The Barber Motorsports Park, round three.  In addition he again was drafted into the Corvette Racing squad for the American Le Mans Series and Le Mans 24 Hours, taking an impressive win in the 12 Hours of Sebring with the No. 4 Corvette also driven by Oliver Gavin, and Tommy Milner. This was Corvette Racing's first Sebring class victory since 2009. It was a perfect way to celebrate Corvette's 60th Anniversary and pay tribute to their first Sebring class victory in 1956.

In 2014, Westbrook clinched third in the inaugural United SportsCar Championship in the USA; his third season with the Spirit of Daytona Racing team. Joining Westbrook and the team for 2014 was Canadian driver Michael Valiante, with DTM Champion and Le Mans Winner Mike Rockenfeller joining the pair for the longer races. At the first race of the year, the 2014 Rolex 24 Hours of Daytona race he, Valiante and Rockenfeller led, before being hit with technical issues in the Spirit of Daytona Corvette Daytona Prototype, but the trio hung on to finish fourth on the road.

He and Valiante took one win in 2014, at the Sahlen 6 Hours, at Watkins Glen International (28/29 June), but a mid-season hot-streak saw them rise up the standings and challenge for the overall title. Contact by a GTD Audi at the season finale, ended his hopes of becoming the Vice-Champion in the series, but he, Mike and Michael finished seventh at the flag to secure third.

In June 2014, Westbrook joined up with Corvette Racing in the new for 2014 no.74 Corvette C.7.R. to attempt to win the 2014 24 Hours of Le Mans. Despite being an early class leader, technical issues ruled him and co-drivers Tommy Milner and Oliver Gavin out of contention for the race win. The trio lost eight laps due to a slipped alternator belt and gearbox leak, but completed the race to take fourth in the GTE PRO category.

Ford Factory Driver (2016)
Westbrook will join Chip Ganassi Racing for the full 2016 WeatherTech SportsCar Championship season driving the new Ford GT with Ryan Briscoe, Joey Hand and Dirk Müller.

Other Series (2011–present) 
While in his first year of Corvette duty in 2011, Westbrook also competed in the now defunct FIA GT1 championship with a Nissan GT-R GT1 prepared by JR Motorsports team, finishing ninth in championship (2 podiums, 1 pole position). He was chosen off the back of his strong performances in the Matech GT1 Ford the year before. In the same year, he also took part in the newly formed Blancpain Endurance Series in the final two races (Magny-Cours and Silverstone) for JR Motorsports in a Nissan GT-R GT3, and competed in the 24 Hours of Spa for Haribo Team Manthey in a Pro-AM Porsche 997 GT3-R. he also drove with his friend David Ashburn in the British GT Championship when available, almost helping Ashburn successfully defend his title, taking 2 wins, 3 podiums, 2 pole positions, and 2 fastest laps along the way.

At the end of 2011, Westbrook raced in Australia at the Armor All Gold Coast 600 in Queensland alongside local hero Todd Kelly in the Jack Daniel's Holden Commodore. He finished both of the races in the unique 600-kilometre event, finishing thirteenth and ninth.

Alongside his busy US commitments, in 2012 he again competed in several European series. Namely British GT (Trackspeed with David Ashburn – 1 win, 2 podiums, 2 pole positions, 1 fastest lap), the Blancpain Endurance Series (Monza and Nurburgring) for the Haribo Racing Team. He also competed in the Nürburgring 24h for the Haribo Racing Team.

In 2013, Westbrook also combined his racing in the US with another part-season in British GT for Trackspeed with Gregor Fisken, taking a dominant win at Rockingham Motor Speedway and staging an impressive fightback after his teammates' opening stint to finish third at the season finale Donington Park – this saw him also awarded the Mobil Service Centre Driver of the Day award.

In 2014, Westbrook was scheduled to again compete in the Nurburgring 24 Hours with Haribo Team Manthey, but an opportunity arose to join an all PRO line-up with Nicki Thiim, Marco Seefried and Alex Müller in the no.9 Prosperia-Abt Audi R8 LMS Ultra GT3, a car he'd driven a few weeks prior in VLN 4. Unfortunately the car failed to make the finish of the 24-hour race due to technical difficulties.

Hypercar (2023–present) 
With the entrance of Cadillac Racing into the Le Mans Hypercar category, Westbrook would partner Earl Bamber and Alex Lynn in the FIA World Endurance Championship, driving a Cadillac V-Series.R. The start of the campaign at Sebring proved to be difficult, as Westbrook collided with the #88 Proton Competition car in Free Practice 2, leaving their car damaged beyond repair and forcing the German team to withdraw from the event. Having caused the incident, the Briton and his team were awarded a "stop and hold" penalty for the start of FP3.

Racing record

Complete Porsche Supercup results
(key) (Races in bold indicate pole position – 2 points awarded 2008 onwards in all races) (Races in italics indicate fastest lap)

‡ – Guest driver – Not eligible for points.

24 Hours of Daytona results

Complete GT1 World Championship results

Complete 24 Hours of Le Mans results

Complete IMSA SportsCar Championship
(key)(Races in bold indicate pole position, Results are overall/class)

* Season still in progress.

Complete FIA World Endurance Championship results

† As Westbrook was a guest driver, he was ineligible to score points.

References

External links
 Official site 
 Richard Westbrook at Driver Database
 Article about Richard winning the Supercup

1975 births
English racing drivers
British Formula Renault 2.0 drivers
FIA GT Championship drivers
Living people
24 Hours of Daytona drivers
American Le Mans Series drivers
European Le Mans Series drivers
Austrian Formula Three Championship drivers
FIA GT1 World Championship drivers
British GT Championship drivers
24 Hours of Le Mans drivers
Supercars Championship drivers
People educated at St Joseph's College, Ipswich
Rolex Sports Car Series drivers
Porsche Supercup drivers
Blancpain Endurance Series drivers
FIA World Endurance Championship drivers
ADAC GT Masters drivers
WeatherTech SportsCar Championship drivers
24 Hours of Spa drivers
Porsche Carrera Cup GB drivers
Corvette Racing drivers
Walter Lechner Racing drivers
Level 5 Motorsports drivers
Chip Ganassi Racing drivers
Aston Martin Racing drivers
JDC Motorsports drivers
Multimatic Motorsports drivers
Abt Sportsline drivers
Nürburgring 24 Hours drivers
Rowe Racing drivers
Kelly Racing drivers
Phoenix Racing drivers
Porsche Carrera Cup Germany drivers